Marco Greco is an actor, writer and artist based in New York City, New York.
Greco's Off-Broadway solo play, Behind the Counter with Mussolini, won a CableACE award in 1997. He was honored by the Bronx Historical Society in 2013, with the Poe award for his contributions to the arts. Greco is the co-founder and former executive director of the Belmont Italian American Playhouse.

References

External links

Marco Greco on Broadway World

Living people
American male actors
American male writers
Year of birth missing (living people)